Langedalstinden is a mountain on the border of Vågå Municipality and Vang Municipality in Innlandet county, Norway. The mountain is surrounded by several other notable mountains including Store Svartdalspiggen to the northwest, Galdeberget and Oksedalshøi to the southwest, Kvitskardtinden to the southeast, and Mesmogtinden and Knutsholstinden to the northeast.

See also
List of mountains of Norway by height

References

Jotunheimen
Vågå
Vang, Oppland
Mountains of Innlandet